Ban Na Le is a village in Sainyabuli Province, Laos. It is located along the main road (Route 4, south of Ban Nakhem and Muang Phiang.

References

Populated places in Sainyabuli Province